Louis Constant Wairy (1778–1845) was valet to Napoleon, Emperor of the French.

He wrote "Mémoires de Constant, premier valet de chambre de l'empereur, sur la vie privée de Napoléon, sa famille et sa cour." ("Memoires of Constant, valet of the emperor; about his private life, his family and his court.")

External links 
 
 

1778 births
1845 deaths